

Gilbert de Hastings (died 1166) was an English monk in the Christian army of the Second Crusade who fought in the Siege of Lisbon. After the victory, he was chosen to be the first Bishop of Lisbon.  Prior to his incumbency, the see of Lisbon had been vacant since the Muslim invasion in 716.

His antecedents are unclear, but it seems probable that he was a younger son of the well-known Anglo-Norman de Hastings family who held the Lordship of the Manor of Ashill in Norfolk, and who, at this time, were Hereditary Stewards of the Abbey of Bury St Edmunds.

Notes

1166 deaths
12th-century Roman Catholic bishops in Portugal
12th-century English people
Bishops of Lisbon
Christians of the Second Crusade
History of Lisbon
People of the Reconquista
People from Breckland District

Portuguese people of British descent
Year of birth unknown